"A World Without Heroes" is a song by the American hard rock band Kiss. It is credited as being written by Gene Simmons, Paul Stanley, Lou Reed and Bob Ezrin, and was originally recorded and released on their 1981 album Music from "The Elder".

Background
Originally titled "Every Little Bit of Your Heart", the lyrics were changed in order to fit the concept of the album, and Lou Reed contributed the line "A world without heroes, is like a world without sun" to the lyrics.

The song is a slow ballad which features Simmons on lead vocals and Stanley notably performing the guitar solo. It was released as the lone single from The Elder album and reached No. 56 in the U.S. and No. 55 in the UK.

A video was made to help promote the single. It is the first to feature Eric Carr, and was the first Kiss video to be played on MTV.

Despite the video and chart performance of the single, Kiss only played it live once during their appearance on the "Fridays" TV show and did not play the song live again until fan request at Kiss conventions in 1995 led them to performing an acoustic version on their Kiss Unplugged performance and subsequent album.

Chart performance

Cher's version
In 1991 Cher recorded a version of this song for her album Love Hurts with Richard Marx on backing vocals.

References

Kiss (band) songs
1981 singles
Cher songs
1980s ballads
Music videos directed by Bruce Gowers
Casablanca Records singles
Songs written by Gene Simmons
Songs written by Lou Reed
Songs written by Bob Ezrin
Songs written by Paul Stanley
Song recordings produced by Bob Ezrin
1981 songs